Lin Lien-hui is a Taiwanese politician.

Lin was a member of the Legislative Yuan from 1981 to 1990, representing Taiwan's fourth district, encompassing Tainan, Chiayi, and Yunlin Counties. Lin contested the 2004 legislative election as an independent candidate from Tainan, though he was not seated.

References

Year of birth missing (living people)
Tainan Members of the Legislative Yuan
Chiayi County Members of the Legislative Yuan
Yunlin County Members of the Legislative Yuan
Kuomintang Members of the Legislative Yuan in Taiwan
Members of the 1st Legislative Yuan in Taiwan